Bruce Hartling Mann (born April 28, 1950) is an American legal scholar who is the Carl F. Schipper, Jr. Professor of Law at Harvard Law School, and husband of U.S. Senator Elizabeth Warren. A legal historian, his research focuses on the relationship among legal, social, and economic change in early United States. He began teaching at Harvard Law School in 2006, after being the Leon Meltzer Professor of Law and Professor of History at the University of Pennsylvania Law School.

Early life and education 
Bruce Hartling Mann was born on April 28, 1950 in Massachusetts. He graduated in 1968 from Hingham High School in Hingham, Massachusetts. He received A.B. and A.M. degrees from Brown University (1972) and M.Phil., J.D., and Ph.D. degrees from Yale University (1975, 1975, and 1977, respectively). His dissertation is titled "Rationality, Legal Change, and Community in Connecticut, 1690–1760." Mann has been licensed to practice law in Connecticut since 1975.

Career 
After graduation, Mann taught at the University of Connecticut School of Law, Washington University School of Law, University of Houston Law Center, University of Texas School of Law, University of Michigan Law School, and the history department at Princeton University. In 1987, Mann started to teach at the University of Pennsylvania Law School.

He is the author of Neighbors and Strangers: Law and Community in Early Connecticut (2001) and Republic of Debtors: Bankruptcy in the Age of American Independence (2009). From 2011 to 2013, Mann served as president of the American Society for Legal History.

Personal life 
Mann is married to Elizabeth Warren, the senior United States senator from Massachusetts and a former law professor. Warren proposed to Mann after she observed him teach a property class, having previously met at a law conference.

Warren officially announced her candidacy for president of the United States on February 8, 2019.

Mann was involved in the Elizabeth Warren Native American ancestry scandal in that he also erroneously claimed Cherokee ancestry in the same 1984 cookbook that Warren did.

Awards 
 SHEAR Book Prize from the Society for Historians of the Early American Republic.
 Littleton-Griswold Prize from the American Historical Association.
 J. Willard Hurst Prize from the Law and Society Association.

References

External links 
Bruce H. Mann at Harvard Law School

1950 births
American legal scholars
Brown University alumni
Connecticut lawyers
Harvard Law School faculty
Legal historians
Living people
Princeton University faculty
Spouses of Massachusetts politicians
University of Connecticut faculty
University of Houston faculty
University of Pennsylvania Law School faculty
University of Texas at Austin faculty
Washington University in St. Louis faculty
Yale Law School alumni
Elizabeth Warren